Croithlí or Croichshlí (anglicised as Crolly) is a village in the Gaeltacht parishes of Gweedore (Gaoth Dobhair) and The Rosses (Na Rossan) in the west of County Donegal, Ireland. The two parishes are separated by the Crolly River. It has one convenience shop/restaurant and petrol station and one public house, Páidí Óg's.

Etymology
The official name of the village is Croithlí. This is taken to come from the old Irish Craithlidh meaning shaking bog or Quagmire. Croichshlí, the less used spelling, means the hanging or crooked way. This most likely refers to how the road twists around the hills.

Features
The village sits at the base of several large hills, among them Án Grógan Mór and Cnoc na bhFaircheach. These hills are remote and sparsely populated. They extend deep into The Rosses.

The Crolly Stone (known in Irish as Cloch Mhór Léim  An tSionnaigh, or the Large Rock Of The Foxes Leap), an erratic left during the Ice Age, is reputed to be the largest boulder in Ireland.

The Crolly River, which flows from Loughanure to an estuary known locally as An Ghaoth, is known for its fishing. The Crolly Waterfall is also nearby. Crolly Bridge also indicates the point where the two parishes meet.

Irish language
As the village is located on the border of The Rosses and Gaoth Dobhair, both districts within the West Donegal Gaeltacht, the Irish language is to be heard and most residents are bilingual. During the summer students stay in the village to learn Irish.

Amenities
There is one petrol station/shop known locally as Stephen Anns. In the village there is one pub, Páidí Ógs. The famous Leo's Tavern is a short walk from the village in the neighbouring townland of Meenaleck, with another pub, Teach Tessie, opposite the tavern. The local garage is McDonaghs' Tyre Centre. There is a caravan park behind Páidí Ógs, and another in Meenaleck, Sleepy Hollow Campsite. Since 2018 there has been a local whiskey distillery called "Croithlí Distillery" located in the former Crolly factory.  There's one Catholic church, known locally as 'the Chapel', for the area located in Meenaweel. As there is no school in the village, children usually attend Scoil Phadraig Dobhair, in the townland of Dobhar, or Scoil Naomh Duigh in Anagaire.

Crolly Dolls
The Crolly Factory opened in 1939, and started making the renowned Crolly Dolls. The early dolls were handmade with a soft-filled body, a strong head and arms and legs. Their clothes were made from local fabrics and knitted vestments. Soft toys for boys, like teddy bears, were also made at the factory.

The original factory closed in the 1970s. This was a major blow to the local economy. However, in 1993, the popularity of the dolls was recognised and a smaller company was reopened. The Crolly Doll is sold all over the world.

Folklore
Most of the townland's folklore refers to Cloch Mhór Léim An tSionnaigh. The boulder's origin is attributed to Fionn Mac Cumhaill. He is reputed to have thrown it at Diarmuid and Grainne during his pursuit of them. In some versions they are sleeping by the Crolly Waterfall and he misses, in others they are on top of Errigal and the Stone bounces off the tip of the mountain.

One story about the Stone suggests that when the most beautiful (or sometimes reddest) girl in Ireland passes under its shadow, it will topple.

Today it is said that if one can successfully throw three stones on top of it, they are granted a wish.

See also
 List of towns and villages in the Republic of Ireland
 List of populated places in the Republic of Ireland
 List of towns and villages in Northern Ireland
 Crolly railway station

References

Gaeltacht places in County Donegal
Gaeltacht towns and villages
Geography of Gweedore
The Rosses
Towns and villages in County Donegal